Silvia Radu (born 27 February 1972) is a Moldovan politician and manager. Between 2008 and 2015 she was the director of Gas Natural Fenosa in the Republic of Moldova. In 2016, she was an independent candidate in that year's presidential election. From 6 November 2017 until April, 2018 Radu served as the ad interim of Mayor of Chișinău.

References

Living people
1972 births
People from Hîncești District
21st-century Moldovan politicians
Women government ministers of Moldova
21st-century Moldovan women politicians